Jyrki Lehtonen (born 16 September 1948) is a Finnish sports shooter. He competed in the mixed 50 metre rifle prone event at the 1980 Summer Olympics.

References

1948 births
Living people
Finnish male sport shooters
Olympic shooters of Finland
Shooters at the 1980 Summer Olympics
Sportspeople from Helsinki